SIOX is an asynchronous serial communication bus that uses  (default 4800) datarates.

See also 
 List of network buses

References 

Serial buses